Willis C. Frazell (December 7, 1891 – January 11, 1958) was an American barber and politician.

Born in Racine, Wisconsin, Frazell went to a business college in Racine. He was a barber until retiring in 1951. During World War I, Frazell served in the United States Navy. Frazell served on the Racine County Board of Supervisors from 1940 to 1946 and was a Republican. Frazell served in the Wisconsin State Assembly from 1943 to 1947. Frazell died at his home in Racine, Wisconsin.

Notes

1891 births
1958 deaths
Politicians from Racine, Wisconsin
Military personnel from Wisconsin
Businesspeople from Wisconsin
Barbers
County supervisors in Wisconsin
Republican Party members of the Wisconsin State Assembly
20th-century American politicians
20th-century American businesspeople